Jälgimäe is a village in Saku Parish, Harju County in northern Estonia.

Botanist Peter von Glehn (1835–1876) and the founder of Nõmme Nikolai von Glehn (1841–1923) were born in Jälgimäe Manor.

References

 

Villages in Harju County
Kreis Harrien